Waxwing was an indie rock band from Seattle, Washington. The band officially broke up in late 2005, stating simply "we are finally calling it quits."

In an interview with Seattle website The Stranger in April 2013 Rocky Votolato claimed that the band were working on new music, stating "We have been writing since early this year and can't wait to record another record. Not sure when that will happen but we're definitely planning on it." Rocky also claimed the band had "hopefully many more [live shows] to come". However as of July 2018 no new music or live shows have materialised and the band has not updated their Facebook page since January 2014.

Discography

Studio albums
Waxwing 7" (Henry's Finest Recordings, 1998)
For Madmen Only (Second Nature Recordings, 1999)
One for the Ride (Second Nature Recordings, 2000)
Intervention: Collection+Remix (Second Nature Recordings, 2001)
Nobody Can Take What Everybody Owns (Second Nature Recordings, 2002)

Compilation appearances
Living Silent (Status Recordings, 1998) - Track "Charmageddon"
Split 7" with The Casket Lottery (Second Nature Recordings, 2000) - Track "Laboratory"
This Changes Everything (Second Nature Recordings, 2001) - Track "Laboratory"
Copper Press Presents ... Volume 13 - Track "Color"

References 

Indie rock musical groups from Washington (state)
Musical groups from Seattle